The Hon. Octavius Duncombe (8 April 1817 – 3 December 1879) was a British Conservative politician.

Background
Duncombe was a younger son of Charles Duncombe, 1st Baron Feversham, and Lady Charlotte, daughter of William Legge, 2nd Earl of Dartmouth. Admiral the Hon. Arthur Duncombe was his elder brother.

Political career
Duncombe was elected Member of Parliament for the North Riding of Yorkshire in 1841, a seat he held until 1859, and again between 1867 and 1874.

Family
Duncombe married Lady Emily Caroline, daughter of John Campbell, 1st Earl Cawdor, in 1842. He died in December 1879, aged 62. His wife died in March 1911.

References

External links 
 

1817 births
1879 deaths
Younger sons of barons
Conservative Party (UK) MPs for English constituencies
UK MPs 1841–1847
UK MPs 1847–1852
UK MPs 1852–1857
UK MPs 1857–1859
UK MPs 1865–1868
UK MPs 1868–1874
Octavius